"Everyday America" is a song co-written and recorded by American country music duo Sugarland.  It was released on May 21, 2007 as the third single from their second album Enjoy the Ride).  It peaked at number 9 on the Billboard Hot Country Songs charts.  The song was also played on the ABC television series Good Morning America from May to September 2007.  It was written by Jennifer Nettles, Kristian Bush and Lisa Carver.

Content
The song is a moderate up-tempo that chronicles the lives of two characters — a female character who "couldn't wait to get out" of the small town in which she was raised, and a male character who was once a football star. Their lives are also exemplified as being examples of modern American people's lives, as stated in the chorus. Sugarland debuted the song in May 2007 at the Academy of Country Music awards.

Critical reception
Thom Jurek of Allmusic described the song favorably in his review of the album, saying that "The looped beats, synths, and organ lines at the beginning of "Everyday America" offer a slippery urban groove to the country mix. There's rhythm here that any soul singer could get behind, and the voices of Nettles and Bush entwine to take in the whole of what the words of that title mean—no matter how small the microcosmic glance at the scenery is." Matt C., a critic for Engine 145, gave "Everyday America" a thumbs-down rating. He called it "contextless slice-of-life" that sounded more appropriate for a television commercial.

Music video
The song's music video was directed by Rocky Schenck. It features Bush and Nettles performing the song in a Los Angeles grocery store. It was filmed in 4 hours in Los Angeles one night. The store stayed open during the shoot.

Use on Good Morning America
"Everyday America" was used by the American Broadcasting Company for their news series Good Morning America from May to September 2007. The show used the song as the theme for a special on-air campaign entitled "GMA Is Here".

Chart performance

Year-end charts

Personnel
The following musicians perform on this song.
Thad Beaty – electric guitar
Brandon Bush – organ, Clavinet, drum loops, percussion
Kristian Bush – acoustic guitar, mandolin, background vocals
Annie Clements – bass guitar, background vocals
Jarrod Johnson – drums
Jennifer Nettles – lead vocals
Scott Patton – electric guitar

References

2007 singles
Mercury Nashville singles
Music videos directed by Rocky Schenck
Song recordings produced by Byron Gallimore
Songs written by Kristian Bush
Songs written by Jennifer Nettles
Sugarland songs
2006 songs